Wayne Miller may refer to:

G. Wayne Miller (born 1954), American author
Wayne F. Miller (1918–2013), American photographer
Wayne Miller (poet) (born 1976), American poet

See also
Wayne Millner (1913–1976), American football player